This is a list of People's Artists of the USSR, a honorary title granted to artists of the Soviet Union between 1936 and 1991. The list covers both the award for performance arts and a separate award for visual arts (Народный художник, Narodny khudozhnik).

The list is sorted in chronological order.

Performing arts (Narodny artist)
During this time, 1006 people were given this honor.

1936 

 Konstantin Stanislavski (1863—1938), theatre practitioner
 Vladimir Nemirovich-Danchenko (1858—1943), theatre director, writer and playwright
 Vasily Kachalov (1875—1948), actor of screen and stage
 Ivan Moskvin (1874—1946), actor of screen and stage
 Ekaterina Korchagina-Alexandrovskaya (1874—1951), theater actress
 Maria Blumenthal-Tamarina (1859—1938), movie and theatre actress
 Antonina Nezhdanova (1873—1950), opera singer (lyric coloratura soprano)
 Boris Shchukin (1894—1939), movie and theatre actor
 Maria Litvinenko-Volgemut (1892—1966), opera singer (lyric dramatic soprano)
 Panas Saksagansky (1859—1940), actor, theater director, playwright
 Akaki Vasadze (1899—1978), actor, theater and teacher
 Akaki Khorava (1895—1972), movie and theatre actor
 Kulyash Baiseitova (1912—1957) (bypassing the title of People's Artist of the RSFSR), opera singer (lyric coloratura soprano)
 Leonid Leonidov (1873—1941), actor and stage director

1937 

 Alexander Vasilyevich Alexandrov (1883—1946) (bypassing the title of People's Artist of the RSFSR), composer and conductor, founder of the Alexandrov Ensemble
 Alla Tarasova (1898—1973) (bypassing the title of People's Artist of the RSFSR), movie and theatre actress
 Nikolai Khmelyov (1901—1945), stage actor 
 Mikhail Tarkhanov (1877—1948), movie and theatre actor
 Halima Nosirova (1913—2003), singer (soprano)
 Valeria Barsova (1892—1967), opera singer (lyric coloratura soprano)
 Ksenia Derzhinskaya (1889—1951), opera singer (dramatic soprano)
 Nadezhda Obukhova (1886—1961), singer (mezzo soprano)
 Alexander Pirogov (1899—1964) (bypassing the title of People's Artist of the RSFSR), opera singer (bass)
 Mark Reizen (1895—1992) (bypassing the title of People's Artist of the RSFSR), opera singer (bass)
 Samuil Samosud (1884—1964), conductor
 Elena Stepanova (1891—1978), opera singer (lyric coloratura soprano)
 Lev Steinberg (1870—1945), conductor and composer
 Boris Dobronravov (1896—1949) (bypassing the title of People's Artist of the RSFSR), stage and film actor
 Mikhail Klimov (1880—1942), stage and film actor
 Olga Knipper (1868—1959), theater actress
 Alexander Ostuzhev (1874—1953), theater actor
 Vera Pashennaya (1887—1962), theater and film actress
 Varvara Ryzhova (1871—1963), actress of theater and cinema
 Prov Sadovsky, jr. (1874—1947), theater actor and director
 Aleksandra Yablochkina (1866—1964), theater actress

1938 
 Ivan Yershov (1867—1943), opera singer (dramatic tenor)
 Bulbul (1897—1961), singer (lyric dramatic tenor)
 Uzeyir Hajibeyov (1885—1948), composer, conductor, publicist, playwright
 Reinhold Glière (1875—1956), composer and conductor
 Shovkat Mammadova (1897—1981), singer (lyric coloratura soprano)

1939 
 Yuri Yuriev (1872—1948), stage actor
 Pavel Zakharovich Andreev (1874—1950), opera singer (bass baritone), soloist of the Kirov Theatre
 Vera Michurina-Samoilova (1866—1948), actress of the Alexandrinsky Theatre
 Solomon Mikhoels (1890—1948), actor and the artistic director of the Moscow State Jewish Theater
 Abdylas Maldybaev (1906—1978) (bypassing the title of People's Artist of the Kirghiz SSR), composer, operatic tenor singer, soloist of the Kyrgyz Opera and Ballet Theater
 Haykanoush Danielyan (1893—1958) (bypassing the title of People's Artist of the Armenian SSR), singer (lyric coloratura soprano), soloist of the Yerevan Opera Theatre

1940 
 Hnat Yura (1888—1966), director, actor of theatre and film, founder of the Ivan Franko National Academic Drama Theater
 Ariy Pazovsky (1887—1953), conductor, chief conductor of the Kirov Theater
 Larisa Alexandrovskaya (1904—1980), opera singer (soprano), soloist of the National Opera and Ballet of Belarus
 Ivan Kozlovsky (1900—1993) (bypassing the title of People's Artist of the RSFSR), opera singer (lyric tenor), soloist of the Bolshoi Theatre
 Maxim Mikhailov (1893—1971) (bypassing the title of People's Artist of the RSFSR), opera singer (bass), soloist of the Bolshoi Theatre
 Gombozhap Tsydynzhapov (1905—1980), actor, stage director, playwright, art director of the Buryat Drama Theater

1941 
 Muhammedjan Kasymov (1907—1971) (bypassing the title of People's Artist of the Tajik SSR), film and theater actor

1943 
 Evdokia Turchaninova (1870—1963), actress of the Maly Theatre

1944 
 Amvrosy Buchma (1891—1957), theater and movie actor, chies director of the Ivan Franko National Academic Drama Theater
 Vasily Vasilko (1893—1972), theater actor , director, art director of the Odessa Academic Ukrainian Music and Drama Theater
 Zoia Gaidai (1902—1965), opera soprano, soloist of the National Opera of Ukraine
 Andrey Alekseevich Ivanov (1900—1970), opera singer, soloist of the National Opera of Ukraine
 Alexander Kramov (1885—1951), theater actor and director, artistic director of the Kharkov Academic Russian Drama Theater
 Maryan Krushelnitsky (1897—1963), theater actor and director, movie actor, artistic director of the Kharkiv Ukrainian Drama Theatre
 Ivan Maryanenko (1878—1962), theater actor
 Ivan Patorzhinsky (1896—1960), opera singer (bass)
 Levko Revutsky (1889—1977), composer
 Boris Romanitsky (1891—1988), actor , theater director
 Nikolai Smolich (1888—1968), theater director
 Natalia Uzhviy (1898—1986), theater and movie actress 
 Konstantin Khokhlov (1885—1956), actor and theater director
 Yuri Shumsky (1887—1954), actor and theater director
 Vladimir Grigoryevich Zakharov (1901—1956), composer
 Nikolai Yakovlev (1869—1950), theater director

1945 
 Abrar Khidoyatov (1900—1958), actor of the Uzbek National Academic Drama Theater

1946 
 Ruben Simonov (1899—1968), actor and director
 Boris Asafyev (1884—1949), composer and musicologist
 Alexander Goldenweiser (1875—1961), pianist, teacher and composer
 Konstantin Igumnov (1873—1948), pianist
 Nikolai Myaskovsky (1881—1950), composer

1947 
 Nikolay Cherkasov (1903—1966), theater and movie actor
 Vladimir Gardin (1877—1965), film director, screenwriter and actor (for 70th birthday)

1948 
 Grigori Aleksandrov (1903—1983), film director
 Ivan Bersenev (1889—1951), theater actor and director, movie actor
 Sergei Vasilyev (1900—1959), film director
 Gleb Glebov (1899—1967), theater and movie actor
 Nikolai Golovanov (1891—1953), conductor, pianist and composer
 Borisas Dauguvietis (1885—1949), theater actor, director and playwright
 Yuri Zavadsky (1894—1977), theater actor and director
 Mikhail Kedrov (1894—1972), theater actor and director, movie actor
 Ants Lauter (1894—1973), theater actor and director, movie actor
 Nikolay Okhlopkov (1900—1967), theater and movie actor and director
 Aleksey Dmitrievich Popov (1892—1961), theater director and pedagogyst
 Vsevolod Pudovkin (1893—1953), film director
 Ivan Pyryev (1901—1968), film director
 Natan Rakhlin (1906—1979), conductor and pedagogyst
 Eduards Smiļģis (1886—1966), theater actor and director
 Mikheil Chiaureli (1894—1974), movie director
 Fridrikh Ermler (1898—1967), movie director
 Olga Androvskaya (1898—1975), theater and film actress
 Alexey Gribov (1902—1977), theater and film actor
 Klavdiya Yelanskaya (1898—1972), theater actress
 Vladimir Yershov (1896—1964), theater and movie actor
 Boris Livanov (1904—1972), theater and movie actor
 Viktor Stanitsyn (1897—1976), theater actor and director, movie actor
 Vasili Toporkov (1889—1970), theater and movie actor, theatre pedagogyst
 Faina Shevchenko (1893—1971), theater actress
 Sergei Gerasimov (1906—1985), film director and actor, screenwriter, pedagogyst
 Pavel Molchanov (1902—1977), theatre actor
 Barys Platonaw (1903—1967), theater and movie actor

1949 
 Vasili Vanin (1898—1951), theater actor and director, movie actor
 Vera Maretskaya (1906—1978), theater and movie actress
 Nikolay Mordvinov (1901—1966), theater and movie actor
 Mirzaagha Aliyev (1883—1954), theater and movie actor
 Marziyya Davudova (1901—1962), theater and movie actress
 Sidgi Ruhulla (1886—1959), theater and movie actor
 Yelena Gogoleva (1900—1993), theater and movie actress
 Aleksei Dikiy (1889—1955), theater actor and director, movie actor
 Mikhail Zharov (1900—1981), theater and movie actor
 Aleksandr Zrazhevsky (1886—1950), theater and movie actor
 Konstantin Zubov (1888—1956), actor and director, pedagogyst
 Igor Ilyinsky (1901—1987), theater and movie actor, director
 Mikhail Tsaryov (1903—1987), theater and movie actor and director, pedagogyst
 Aman Kul'mamedov (1908—1977), theater and movie actor

1950 

 Mikheil Gelovani (1893—1956), theater and movie actor
 Marina Ladynina (1908—2003), theater and movie actress
 Tamara Makarova (1907—1997), movie actress
 Lyubov Orlova (1902—1975), theater and movie actress
 Vladimir Petrov (1896—1966), film director
 Mikhail Romm (1901—1971), film director
 Nikolay Simonov (1901—1973), film and stage actor
 Boris Chirkov (1901—1982), film and stage actor
 Sergei Lemeshev (1902—1977), opera singer (lyric tenor)
 Kipras Petrauskas (1885—1968), opera singer (lyric dramatic tenor), pedagogyst
 Mykhaĭlo Hryshko (1901—1973), opera singer (dramatic baritone)
 Petr Amiranashvili (1907—1976), opera singer (baritone)
 David Andguladze (1895—1973), opera singer (dramatic tenor)
 Veriko Anjaparidze (1900—1987), theater and movie actress
 Aleksandr Inashvili (1887—1958), opera singer (baritone)
 Vakhtang Chabukiani (1910—1992), ballet dancer

1951 

 Aleksandr Borisov (1905—1982), theater and movie actor
 Alexey Petrovich Ivanov (1904—1982), opera singer (baritone)
 Olga Lepeshinskaya (1916—2008), ballet dancer
 Alexander Melik-Pashayev (1905—1964), conductor
 Georgii Nelepp (1904—1957), opera singer (dramatic tenor)
 Galina Ulanova (1910—1998), ballet dancer
 Yuri Fayer (1890—1971), conductor
 Nikandr Khanayev (1890—1974), opera singer (dramatic tenor)
 Boris Gmyrya (1903—1969) (bypassing the title of People's Artist of the Ukrainian SSR), opera singer (bass)
 Mikhail Fedorovich Romanov (1896—1963), theater actor and director, movie actor
 Aleksandr Serdyuk (1900—1988), theater and movie actor
 Mukhtar Ashrafi (1912—1975), composer and conductor
 Sara Ishanturaeva (1911—1998), theater actress

1952 
 Sergei Bondarchuk (1920—1994) (bypassing the title of People's Artist of the RSFSR), movie director and actor
 Yelizaveta Chavdar (1925—1989) (bypassing all titles), opera singer (coloratura soprano)

1953 

 David Oistrakh (1908—1974), violinist and conductor
 Alfred Amtman-Bredit (1885—1966), theater actor and director
 Igor Moiseyev (1906—2007), choreographer
 Alexander Kontantinovich Ilyinsy (1903—1967), theater and movie actor
 Konstantin Skorobogatov (1887—1969), theater and movie actor

1954 

 Maria Babanova (1900—1983), theater and movie actress
 Lev Sverdlin (1901—1969), theater and movie actor
 Tiit Kuusik (1911—1990), opera singer (baritone)
 Balys Dvarionas (1904—1972), composer, conductor, pianist and pedagogyst
 Juozas Siparis (1894—1970), theater and movie actor
 Jonas Švedas (1908—1971), composer and conductor
 Leonid Sergeevich Vivian (1887—1966), actor, director, theater teacher
 Emil Gilels (1916—1985), pianist 
 Yevgeny Mravinsky (1903—1988) (bypassing the title of People's Artist of the RSFSR), conductor
 Aram Khachaturian (1903—1978), composer
 Yuri Shaporin (1887—1966), composer
 Dmitri Shostakovich (1906—1975), composer
 Sergey Obraztsov (1901—1992), theatrical figure, actor and director of the puppet theater
 Vagharsh Vagharshian (1894—1959), theater actor, director, playwright
 Daniil Antonovich (1889—1975), theater and movie actor
 Petr Belinnik (1906—1998), opera singer (lyric tenor)
 Aleksandra Voronovich (1898—1985), theater actress
 Konstantyn Dankevych (1905—1984), composer, pianist, teacher
 Vasyl Yaremenko (1895—1976), actor

1955 
 Nikolay Yakushenko (1897—1971), actor
 Vladimir Vladomirskiy (1893—1971), theater actor
 Lidiya Ivanovna Rzhetskaya (1899—1977), theater and movie actress
 Jewgeni Karlowitsch Tikoski (1893—1970), composer
 Ryhor Ramanavich Shyrma (1892—1978), choir conductor, folklorist
 Mikhail Yanshin (1902—1976), theater and movie actor
 Arslan Muboryakov (1908—1977), theater and film actor, theater director
 Zaytuna Nasretdinova (1923—2009), ballet dancer
 Mikhail Astangov (1900—1965), theater and film actor
 Sofia Preobrazhenskaya (1904—1966), opera singer (mezzo-soprano)
 Alty Karliev (1909—1973), theater actor and director, film actor, film director
 Maya Kuliyeva (1920—2018), opera singer (lyric soprano)
 Sona Muradova (1914—1997), theater actress
 Sofya Giatsintova (1895—1982), theater actress and director, film actress

1956 

 Lilita Berzina (1903—1983), theater and film actress
 Janis Osis (1895—1973), theater and movie actor
 Yuri Yurovsky (1894—1959), theater actor and director, film actor
 Nikolay Vorvulev (1917—1967), opera singer
 Yuri Tolubeyev (1906—1979), theater and movie actor
 Tamara Khanum (1906—1991), dancer, founder of the Uzbek ballet
 Gohar Gasparyan (1924—2007), opera singer (soprano)
 Hrachia Nersisyan (1895—1961), theater and film actor
 Vahram Papazian (1888—1968), theater actor
 Tatevik Sazandaryan (1916—1999), opera singer (mezzo-soprano)
 Mikael Tabrizyan (1907—1957), conductor
 Grigori Belov (1895—1965), theater and movie actor
 Pavel Lisitsian (1911—2004), opera singer (baritone)
 Aleksandr Larikov (1890—1960), theater actor
 Vasiliy Yakovlevich Sofronov (1884—1960), theater and movie actor
 Boris Ilyin (1901—1979), theater actor
 Aleksandr Bryantsev (1883—1961), theater director
 Alexander Svechnikov (1890—1980), choral conductor
 Aleksei Krivchenya (1910—1974),opera singer (bass)
 Eugen Kapp (1908—1996), composer
 Kaarel Karm (1906—1979), theater and movie actor
 Gustav Ernesaks (1908—1993), composer and choir conductor

1957 
 Anastasia Zuyeva (1896—1986), theater and film actress
 Gulomkhaydar Gulomaliev (1904—1961), choreographer
 Lutfi Zohidova (1925—1995), ballet dancer
 Tuhfa Fozilova (1917—1985), opera singer (soprano)
 Xälil Äbcälilef (1896—1963), theater and movie actor
 Näcip Cihanov (1911—1988), composer
 Elena Zhilina (1890—1963), theater actress
 Natalia Dudinskaya (1912—2003), ballet dancer
 Konstantin Laptev (1904—1990), opera singer
 Vitali Politseymako (1906—1967), theater and movie actor
 Konstantin Sergeyev (1910—1992), ballet dancer, choreographer
 Georgy Tovstonogov (1915—1989), theater director

1958 
 Vasiliy Mestnikov (1908—1958), theater actor and director
 Dmitriy Khodulov (1912—1977), theater actor and director
 Boris Alexandrovich Alexandrov (1905—1994), composer, conductor
 Konstantin Ivanov (1907—1984), conductor
 Vaso Godziashvili (1905—1976), theater and movie actor
 Odysseas Dimitriadis (1908—2005), conductor
 Sergo Zakariadze (1909—1971), theater and movie actor
 Aleksi Machavariani (1913—1995), composer
 Iliko Sukhishvili (1907—1985), ballet dancer
 Bubusara Beyshenalieva (1926—1973), ballet dancer
 Sayra Kiizbaeva (1917—1988), opera singer (lyric-dramatic soprano)
 Muratbek Ryskulov (1909—1974), theater and movie actor
 Sergei Ivanovich Papov (1904—1970) theater and movie actor

1959 

 Shaken Ajmanov (1914—1970), actor and film director
 Roza Jamanova (1928—2013), opera singer (soprano)
 Kalibek Kuanyshpaev (1893—1968), theater and movie actor
 Yermek Serkebaev (1926—2013), opera singer (lyric baritone)
 Mukan Tulebaev (1913—1960), composer
 Valentina Kharlamova (1911—1999), theater actress
 Shukur Burkhanov (1910—1987), theater and film actor
 Saodat Kabulova (1925—2007), opera singer (lyric-coloratura soprano)
 Mukarram Turgunbaeva (1913—1978), ballet dancer
 Olim Xoʻjayev (1910—1977), theater and film actor
 Kamil Yarmatov (1903—1978), actor, film director, screenwriter
 Nikolay Pokrovskiy (1896—1961), theater actor and director
 Gamar Almaszadeh (1915—2006), ballet dancer
 Rashid Behbudov (1915—1989), pop and opera singer (lyric tenor)
 Adil Isgandarov (1912—1978), theater actor and director
 Gara Garayev (1918—1982), composer
 Niyazi (1912—1984), conductor, composer
 Ivan Ivanovich Petrov (1920—2003), opera singer (bass)
 Maya Plisetskaya (1925—2015), ballet dancer
 Raisa Struchkova (1925—2005), ballet dancer
 Liisa Tomberg (1909—1988), stage actress
 Lkhasaran Linkhovoin (1924—1980), opera singer (bass)

1960 
 Nikolay Akimov (1901—1968), painter, theater artist, director and teacher
 Nikolay Annenkov (1899—1999), theater and film actor
 Vasily Orlov (1896—1974), theater actor, director, theater teacher
 Angelina Stepanova (1905—2000), theater and film actress
 Bariyat Muradova (1914—2001), stage actress
 Nina Masalskaya (1901—1989), actress
 Tamara Ceban (1914—1990), opera singer (soprano)
 Chiril Știrbu (1915—1997), stage actor
 Vladimir Chestnokov (1904—1968), theater and film actor, theater teacher
 Georg Ots (1920—1975), opera singer (baritone)
 Vladimir Tkhapsaev (1910—1981), theater and film actor
 Vasili Merkuryev (1904—1978), theater and film actor, teacher
 Evgeniy Bondarenko (1905—1977), theater and film actor
 Pavlo Virsky (1905—1975), ballet dancer, choreographer
 Dmytro Hnatyuk (1925—2016), opera singer (baritone)(bypassing the title of People's Artist of the Ukrainian SSR)
 Volodymyr Dalsky (1912—1998), stage actor
 Viktor Dobrovolsky (1906—1984), theater and film actor
 Pavlo Karmaliuk (1908—1986), opera singer (baritone)
 Polina Kumanchenko (1910—1992), theater and film actress
 Yuri Lavrov (1905—1980), theater and film actor
 Vladimir Magar (1900—1965), theater actor and director
 Heorhiy Maiboroda (1913—1992), composer
 Dmitri Milyutenko (1899—1966), theater and film actor
 Oleksandr Minkivskyi (1900—1979), choral conductor
 Yevhen Ponomarenko (1909—1994), theater and film actor
 Bela Rudenko (1933—2021), opera singer (lyric-coloratura soprano)
 Larisa Rudenko (1918—1981), opera singer (mezzo-soprano)
 Lidiya Myasnikova (1911—2005), opera singer (mezzo-soprano)

1961 
 Sviatoslav Richter (1915—1997), pianist
 Alasgar Alakbarov (1910—1963), theater and film actor
 Faina Ranevskaya (1896—1984), theater and film actress
 Rostislav Plyatt (1908—1989), theater and film actor
 Petr Kaz'min (1892—1964), folklorist
 Tatyana Alekseevna Ustinova (1909—1999), choreographer
 Mark Prudkin (1898—1994), theater and film actor
 Boris Pokrovsky (1912—2009), theater director

1962 
 Iosif Tolchanov (1891—1981), theater and film actor, director
 Sergei Yutkevich (1904—1985), theater and film director
 Galiya Izmaylova (1923—2010), ballet dancer
 Boris Andreyev (1915—1982), theater and film actor
 Avet Avetisyan (1897—1971), theater and film actor
 Pavel Serebryakov (1909—1977), pianist, teacher
 Artūrs Frinbergs (1916—1984), opera singer (dramatic tenor)
 Vakhtang Vronsky (1905—1988), choreographer
 Konstantin Simeonov (1910—1987), conductor, teacher

1963 
 Sergei Blinnikov (1901—1969), theater and film actor, theater director
 Anatoly Ktorov (1898—1980), theater and film actor
 Pavel Massalsky (1904—1979), theater and film actor
 Boris Petker (1902—1983), theater and film actor
 Boris Aleksandrovich Smirnov (1908—1982), theater and film actor
 Dmitry Kabalevsky (1904—1987), composer
 Tikhon Khrennikov (1913—2007), composer
 Boris Babochkin (1904—1975), theater and film actor, theater teacher
 Nino Ramishvili (1910—2000), dancer, choreographer
 Larisa Sakhyanova (1930—2001), ballet dancer

1964 
 Bukeyeva Khadisha Bukeyevna (1917—2011), stage actress
 Yuli Raizman (1903—1994), film director
 Grigori Kozintsev (1905—1973), film and theater director, screenwriter
 Nikolai Gritsenko (1912—1979), theater and film actor
 Lev Oborin (1907—1974), pianist
 Tamara Nizhnikova (1925—2018), opera singer
 Ninel' Tkachenko (1928—2007),opera singer (soprano)
 Aleksandr Ivanov (1898—1984), film director
 Iosif Kheifits (1905—1995), film director
 Genovaitė Sabaliauskaitė (1923—2020), ballet dancer
 Jonas Stasiūnas (1919—1987), opera singer (baritone)
 Nar Ovanisyan (1913—1995), opera singer (bass)
 Iosif Tumanishvili (1909—1981), theater director
 Nabi Rakhimov (1911—1994), theater and film artist
 Ants Eskola (1908—1989), theater and film actor
 Firs Shishigin (1908—1985), theater director

1965 

 Nikolay Krjuchkov (1911—1994), film actor
 Aleksandr Ognivtsev (1920—1981), opera singer (bass)
 Fikret Amirov (1922—1984), composer, pianist
 Hokuma Gurbanova (1913—1988), stage actress
 Vladimir Belokurov (1904—1973), theater and film actor
 Tatul Altunyan (1901—1973), choirmaster
 Bazar Amanov (1908—1981), stage actor, playwright
 Annagul Annakuliyeva (1924—2009),opera singer (soprano)
 Veli Mukhatov (1916—2005), composer
 Leonid Utyosov (1895—1982), entertainer, singer, conductor, film actor
 Leonid Lavrovsky (1905—1967), choreographer
 Asli Burkhanov (1915—1997), theater actor and director, film actor
 Lyubov Dobrzhanskaya (1908—1980), theater and film actress
 Andrei Popov (1918—1983), theater and film artist, theater director, teacher
 Evgeniya Miroshnichenko (1931—2009), opera singer (lyric-coloratura soprano)
 Mikhail Bolduman (1898—1983), theater and film actor
 Olena Katulska (1888—1966), opera singer (lyric-coloratura soprano)
 Velta Vilciņa (1928—1995), ballet dancer
 Jānis Ivanovs (1906—1983), composer
 Nikolay Svetlovidov (1889—1970), stage actor
 Vardan Ajemian (1905—1977), theater director
 Irina Kolpakova (р. 1933), ballet dancer
 Siko Dolidze (1903—1983), film director
 Maksim Shtraukh (1900—1974), theater and film actor

1966 

 Aino Talvi (1909—1992), stage actress
 Sesilia Takaishvili (1906—1984), theater and film actress
 Boris Shtokolov (1930—2005),opera singer (bass)
 Pyotr Konstantinov (1899—1973), theater and film actor
 Zurab Anjaparidze (1928—1997), opera singer (lyric-dramatic tenor)
 Irina Arkhipova (1925—2010), opera singer (mezzo-soprano)
 Galina Vishnevskaya (1926—2012), opera singer (soprano)
 Nadezhda Nadezhdina (1908—1979), ballet dancer and choreographer
 Yakov Zak (1913—1976), pianist, teacher
 Leonid Kogan (1924—1982), violinist
 Klavdiy Ptitsa (1911—1983), choral conductor
 Mstislav Rostropovich (1927—2007), cellist
 Vladislav Gennadievich Sokolov (1908—1993), choral conductor
 Yakov Flier (1912—1977), pianist
 Xenia Erdeli (1878—1971), harpist
 Leanid Rakhlenka (1907—1986), theater actor and director, film actor
 Nikolai Plotnikov (1897—1979),actor, director, theater teacher
 Roman Karmen (1906—1978), cinematographer, film director
 Mark Donskoy (1901—1981), film director and playwright

1967 

 Georgi Assatijani (1914—1977), documentary film director and cinematographer
 Lyutfi Sarymsakova (1896—1991), theater and film actress
 Vasily Solovyov-Sedoi (1907—1979), composer
 Grigoriy Roshal (1898—1983), film director
 Rakhim Pirmukhamedov (1897—1972), theater and film actor
 Rishat Abdullin (1916—1988), opera singer (baritone)
 Roza Baglanova (1922—2011), opera and pop singer (soprano)
 Vladimir Durov (1909—1972), circus performer (tamer)
 Bibigul Tulegenova (р. 1929), opera singer (coloratura soprano)
 Lidia Chernysheva (1912—1975), ballet dancer, choreographer
 Vladimir Vladislavsky (1891—1970), theater and film actor
 Malik Kayumov (1912—2010), cinematographer, film director
 Darkul Kuyukova (1919—1997), theater and film actress
 Artyk Myrzabaev (1930—2005), opera singer (baritone)
 Olga Kusenko (1919—1997), theater and film actress
 Yevhen Chervoniuk (1924—1982), opera singer (bass)
 Boris Zakhava (1896—1976), theater actor and director
 Timofeĭ Ivanovich Gurtovoĭ (1919—1981), conductor
 Eugeniu Ureche (1917—2005), theater and film actor, singer
 Heino Eller (1887—1970), composer, teacher
 Gurgen Janibekyan (1897—1978), theater and film actor
 Franghiz Ahmadova (1928—2011), opera singer (soprano)
 Leyla Vakilova (1927—1999), ballet dancer
 Evgeny Belyaev (1926—1994), singer (lyric tenor)
 Alexey Sergeev (1919—1998), singer (bass)

1968 

 Yevgeni Lebedev (1917—1997), theater and film actor
 Antonina Samarina (1892—1971), stage actress
 Yuri Gulyayev (1930—1986), opera singer (lyric baritone)
 Valentyna Kalynovska (b. 1938), ballet dancer
 Andria Balanchivadze (1906—1992), composer
 Ilya Kopalin (1900—1976), documentary filmmaker
 Archil Chkhartishvili (1905—1980), theater director
 Elena Mitrofanovna Shatrova-Kazankova (1892—1976), stage actress
 Andrei Abrikosov (1906—1973), theater and film actor
 Hanifa Mavlianova (1924—2010), opera singer (soprano)
 Arkady Raikin (1911—1987), theater and film actor
 Oyimxon Shomurotova (1917—1993), stage actress
 Jazep Žynovič (1907—1974), composer and conductor
 Vano Muradeli (1908—1970), composer
 Zdzislaw Stoma (1907—1992), theater and film actor
 Gennady Ivanovich Tsitovich (1910—1986), choir conductor, musicologist
 Yevgeny Svetlanov (1928—2002), conductor
 Anastasiya Georgiyevskaya (1914—1990), theater and film actress
 Boris Ravenskikh (1914—1980), theatre director
 Aleksey Zhiltsov (1895—1972), stage actor
 Iosif Raevskiy (1901—1972), actor, director, teacher

1969 

 Razak Khamrayev (1910—1981), theater and film actor and director
 Vija Artmane (1929—2008), theater and film actress
 Žermēna Heine-Vāgnere (1923—2017), opera singer (lyric-dramatic soprano)
 Nina Timofeeva (1935—2014), ballet dancer
 Boris Alekseyev (1911—1973), stage actor
 Yuliya Borisova (b. 1925), theater and film actress
 Yefim Dzigan (1898—1981), film director
 Oleg Zhakov (1905—1988), film actor
 Aleksandr Zarkhi (1908—1997), film director
 Alexander Zguridi (1904—1998), film director, TV presenter
 Mikhail Kalatozov (1903—1973), film director
 Vladimir Korsh (1900—1974), film director
 Aleksandr Ptushko (1900—1973), film director
 Vsevolod Sanayev (1912—1996), theater and film actor
 Mikhail Ulyanov (1927—2007), theater and film actor
 Irina Bugrimova (1910—2001), circus performer (lion trainer)
 Eugene Milaev (1910—1983), circus performer, equilibrist
 Oleg Popov (1930—2016), circus clown
 Karandash (Mikhail Nikolayevich Rumyantsev; 1901—1983), circus clown
 Valentin Filatov (1920—1979), circus performer (tamer)
 Aleksandra Klimova (1921—2005), stage actress
 Evgeniy Polosin (1912—1982), theater and film actor
 Galina Zagurskaya (1905—1978), stage actress
 Stanyslav Lyudkevych (1879—1979), composer
 Rostislav Zakharov (1907—1984), choreographer, director

1970 
 Anatoly Novikov (1896—1984), composer
 Juozas Lingys (1919—1984), ballet dancer, choreographer
 Kaarel Ird (1909—1986), theater actor and director
 Olena Potapova (р. 1930), ballet dancer
 Abbos Bakirov (1910—1974), theater actor and director
 Maria Bieșu (1934—2012), opera singer (lyric-dramatic soprano)
 Lidiya Freimane (1920—1992), stage actress
 Baken Kydykeyeva (1923—1993), theater and film actress
 Ivan Lyubeznov (1909—1988), theater and film actor
 Violetta Bovt (1927—1995), ballet dancer
 Stepan Kevorkov (1903—1991), film director
 Klavdia Kudriashova (1925—2012), opera singer (mezzo-soprano)
 Virgilijus Noreika (1935—2018), opera singer (tenor)
 Georgy Sviridov (1915—1998), composer
 Aleksey Yermolayev (1910—1975), ballet dancer, choreographer, teacher
 Lidiya Knyazeva (1925—1987), theater and film actress
 Valentina Sperantova (1904—1978), theater and film actress
 Evgeniy Diordiev (1912—1985), theater actor and director, film actor
 Sabira Maykanova (1914—1994), stage actress
 Vladimir Burmeister (1904—1971), choreographer
 Alexander Arutiunian (1920—2012), composer
 Marģeris Zariņš (1910—1993), composer
 Vladimir Kandelaki (1908—1994), opera singer (bass-baritone) and director

1971 

 Lidia Krupenina (1928—2016), ballet dancer
 Yury Durov (1910—1971), circus performer, trainer
 Dodo Antadze (1900—1978), theater actor and director
 Uladzimir Dziadziuška (1905—1973), theater and film actor
 Ata Durdyev (1910—1981), theater and film actor
 Arkadiy Hashynsky (1920—1991), stage actor
 Hrachya Ghaplanyan (1923—1988), theater director
 Mikhail Kuznetsov (1913—1995), theater and film actor
 Klavdiya Shulzhenko (1906—1984), pop singer
 Arno Babajanian (1921—1983), composer
 Akhmad Babakulov (1931—1990), opera singer (dramatic tenor)
 Alexander Rybnov (1906—1992), choral conductor
 Mikhail Kirillov (1900—1971), theater actor and director
 Nikolai Ryzhov (1900—1986), actor 
 Anatoli Aleksandrov (1888—1982), composer, pianist, teacher
 Maria Maksakova Sr. (1902—1974), opera singer (mezzo-soprano)
 Erasmus Alexandrovich Karamyan (1912—1985), film director
 Aleksandr Kasyanov (1891—1982), composer, teacher
 Yelizaveta Alekseyeva (1901—1972), stage actress
 Tsetsilia Mansurova (1896—1976), theater and film actress

1972 

 Timofiy Levchuk (1912—1998), film director
 Natalya Burmistrova (1918—2008), stage actress
 Tatyana Pelttser (1904—1992), theater and film actress
 Kirill Kondrashin (1914—1981), conductor
 Boris Khaikin (1904—1978), conductor
 Igor Gorbachyov (1927—2003), theater actor and director, film actor
 Kirill Lavrov (1925—2007), theater and film actor
 Leonid Tarabarinov (1928—2008), theater and film actor
 Nadezhda Dotsenko (1914—1994), stage actress
 Arus Asryan (1904—1987), stage actress
 Babken Nersisyan (1917—1986), theater and film actor
 Andriy Shtoharenko (1902—1992), composer, teacher

1973 

 Raisa Sergienko (1925—1987), opera singer (lyric-dramatic soprano)
 Aleksandr Khanov (1904—1983), stage actor
 Lyudmila Zykina (1929—2009), singer
 Yury Grigorovich (b. 1927), ballet dancer, choreographer
 Bernara Karieva (b. 1936), ballet dancer
 Zaituna Bikbulatova (1908—1992), stage actress
 Alfrēds Jaunušans (1919—2008), theater actor and director
 Soltan Hajibeyov (1919—1974), composer
 Tamara Milashkina (b. 1934), opera singer (soprano)
 Yefim Kopelyan (1912—1975), theater and film actor
 Juozas Miltinis (1907—1994), theater director
 Vladimir Vasiliev (b. 1940), ballet dancer and choreographer
 Ekaterina Maximova (1939—2009), ballet dancer
 Anatoli Papanov (1922—1987), theater and film actor
 Viktor Khokhryakov (1913—1986), theater and film actor
 Andrey Prisyazhnyuk (1912—1982), stage actor
 Velta Līne (1923—2012), theater and film actress
 Nina Ivanovna Menovshchikova (b. 1934), ballet dancer
 Muslim Magomayev (1942—2008), opera and pop singer (baritone), soloist of the Azerbaijan State Academic Opera and Ballet Theater
 Sofia Golovkina (1915—2004), ballet dancer and teacher
 Yuri Nikulin (1921—1997), circus performer, film actor
 Yuri Soloviev (1940—1977), ballet dancer

1974 

 Malika Sobirova (1942—1982), ballet dancer
 Yevgeny Matveyev (1922—2003), theater and film actor, film director
 Nonna Mordyukova (1925—2008), film actress
 Domnika Dariyenko (1919—2010), stage actress
 David Malyan (1904—1976), theater and film actor
 Vladislav Strzhelchik (1921—1995), theater and film actor
 Lidiya Smirnova (1913—2007), theater and film actress
 Galina Vladimirovna Kovaleva (1932—1995), opera singer (coloratura soprano)
 Ismayil Daghistanli (1907—1980), stage actor
 Ismayil Osmanli (1902—1978), theater and film actor
 Makhmud Esambayev (1924—2000), dancer
 Mehdi Mammadov (1918—1985), theater director
 Stanislav Rostotsky (1922—2001), film director
 Otar Taktakishvili (1924—1989), composer
 Vyacheslav Tikhonov (1928—2009), film actor
 Georgi Menglet (1912—2001), theater and film actor
 Karlis Sebris (1914—2009), theater and film actor
 Valentin Pluchek (1909—2002), theater director, actor
 Yevgeny Samoylov (1912—2006), theater and film actor
 Innokenty Smoktunovsky (1925—1994), theater and film actor
 Ninel Kurgapkina (1929—2009), ballet dancer
 Nikolay Volchkov (1910—2003?), theater artist
 Yury Kiselyov (1914—1996), theater actor and director
 Bruno Freindlich (1909—2002), theater and film actor
 Donatas Banionis (1924—2014), theater and film actor

1975 
 Marina Semyonova (1908—2010), ballet dancer
 Anatoliy Solovianenko (1932—1999), opera singer, tenor
 Vladimir Zeldin (1915—2016), theater and film actor
 Lyudmila Kasatkina (1925—2012), theater and film actress
 Ivan Marin (1905—1983), theater and film actor
 Ivan Pereverzev (1914—1978), theater and film actor
 Diana Petrynenko (1930—2018), singer (lyric-coloratura soprano)
 Fyodor Ivanovych Shmakov (1917—2009), theater and film actor
 Dmitry Pokrass (1899—1978), composer
 Evgeniĭ Simonov (1925—1994), theater director
 Matvey Blanter (1903—1990), composer
 Medeniyet Shahberdiyeva (1930—2018), opera singer (coloratura soprano)
 Konstantin Iraklievich Massalitinov (1905—1979), composer, choir conductor
 Natalya Sats (1903—1993), theater director
 Michail Alekseevitsj Koelikovskiy (1906—1996), theater actor and director
 Jurij Silantiev (1919—1983), conductor, composer
 Fuat Xalitef (1909—1981), stage actor
 Valeriy Nel'skiy (1906—1990), stage actor
 Jüri Järvet (1919—1995), theater and film actor

1976 

 Elza Radziņa (1917—2005), theater and film actress
 Aleksey Urgalkin (1910—1981), stage actor
 Dmitriy Aleksidze (1910—1984), theater director
 Isidor Zak (1909—1998), conductor
 Vladimir Atlantov (b. 1939), opera singer (lyric-dramatic tenor)
 Natalia Bessmertnova (1941—2008), ballet dancer
 Alexander Vedernikov (1927—2018), opera singer (bass)
 Vera Dulova (1909—2000), harpist
 Marina Kondratyeva (b. 1934), ballet dancer
 Mikhail Lavrovsky (b. 1941), артист балета, балетмейстер
 Māris Liepa (1936—1989), ballet dancer
 Juri Mazurok (1931—2006), opera singer (baritone)
 Asaf Messerer (1903—1992), ballet dancer, teacher and choreographer
 Yevgeny Nesterenko (р. 1938), opera singer (bass)
 Elena Obraztsova (1939—2015), opera singer (mezzo-soprano)
 Gennady Rozhdestvensky (1931—2018), conductor
 Nikolai Fadeyechev (1933—2020), ballet dancer, teacher
 Arthur Eisen (1927—2008), opera singer (bass)
 Peter Loboda (1907—1979), stage actor
 Gafar Valamat-Zade (1916—1993), ballet dancer, choreographer
 Ivan Avramov (1915—1985), theater actor and director
 Arvīds Jansons (1914—1984), conductor
 Mikhail Vodyanoy (1924—1987), operetta artist, film actor
 Serghei Lunchevici (1934—1995), conductor, violinist, composer
 Oleg Yefremov (1927—2000), theater and film actor and director
 Yury Yakovlev (1928—2013), theater and film actor
 Tamara Alioșina-Alexandrova (1928—1996), opera singer (mezzo-soprano)
 Nikolay Manoylo (1927—1998), opera singer (baritone)
 Anatoliy Mokrenko (1933—2020), opera singer (baritone)
 Nonna Andriivna Surzhina (b. 1937), opera singer (mezzo-soprano)
 Aleksey Batalov (1928—2017), theater and film actor
 Irina Bogacheva (1939—2019), opera singer (mezzo-soprano)
 Sergey Vikulov (b. 1937), ballet dancer, choreographer
 Asankhan Dzhumakhmatov (1923—2008), composer
 Lev Kulidzhanov (1924—2002), film director
 Bulat Minzhilkiev (1940—1997), opera singer (bass)
 Alexander Murin (1917—1992), choral conductor
 Mariya Stepanova (1916—1983), theater and film actress
 Yefim Uchitel (1913—1988), documentary film director and cinematographer
 Lyudmila Erofeeva (1937—2003), opera singer (lyric-coloratura soprano)
 Kārlis Zariņš (1930—2015), singer (dramatic tenor)
 Medea Amiranashvili (b. 1930), opera singer (lyric soprano)
 Azerbaijan Mambetov (1932—2009), theater director
 Lamara Chkonia (р. 1930), opera singer (lyric-coloratura soprano)

1977 
 Nijolė Ambrazaitytė (1939—2016), opera singer (mezzo-soprano)
 Svyatlana Danilyuk (1939—2003), opera singer (mezzo-soprano)
 Lutfi Kabirova (1932—2013), opera singer (soprano)
 Tiiu Randviir (р. 1938), ballet dancer
 Yuri Ozerov (1921—2001), film director
 Lutfiyar Imanov (1928—2008), opera singer (dramatic tenor)
 Migran Erkat (1921—1986), opera singer (baritone)
 Nina Sazonova (1917—2004), theater and film actress
 Oleksandr Hai (1914—2000), theater and film actor
 Mikhail Godenko (1919—1991), ballet dancer, choreographer
 Zakir Mukhamedzhanov (1921—2012), theater and film actor
 Grigor Yeghiazaryan (1908—1988), composer
 Vera Ershova (1917—2006), stage actress
 Azat Abbasov (1925—2006), opera singer (lyric tenor)
 Khydyr Allanurov (1922—1993), conductor
 Veronika Dudarova (1916—2009), conductor
 Lyudmila Makarova (1921—2014), stage actress
 Voldemar Panso (1920—1977), theater actor and director, film actor
 Fedir Vereshchahin (1910—1996), theater director
 Andrey Goncharov (1918—2001), theater director, theater teacher
 Şäwkät Biktimeref (1928—2012), stage actor
 Arkadi Iwanowitsch Arkadjew (1907—1993), theater actor and director, film actor
 Aleksandr Stolper (1907—1979), film director, screenwriter
 Konstantin Stepankov (1928—2004), theater and film actor
 Erast Garin (1902—1980), theater actor and director, film actor
 Stefan Turchak (1938—1988), conductor
 Daniil Shafran (1923—1997), cellist
 Dilbar Abdurahmonova (1936—2018), conductor

1978 

 Yevgeny Leonov (1926—1994), theater and film actor
 Yelena Fadeyeva (1914—1999), theater and film actress
 Tatyana Shmyga (1928—2011), operetta artist, film actress
 Vladimir Kurochkin (1922—2002), actor and director of operettas
 Igor Vladimirov (1919—1999), actor and director
 Valery Kovtun (1944—2005), ballet dancer
 Rostislav Yankovsky (1930—2016), theater and film actor
 Olga Bardina (1932—2001), opera singer (lyric-dramatic soprano)
 Yury Popov (1929—2013), opera singer (dramatic baritone)
 Tankho Israilov (1918—1981), ballet dancer, choreographer
 Helmer-Rainer Sinisalo (1920—1989), composer
 Elina Bystritskaya (1928—2019), theater and film actress
 Rufina Nifontova (1931—1994), theater and film actress
 Henrikas Vancevičius (1924—2014), theater director
 Rauf Hajiyev (1922—1995), composer
 Suren Babloev (1918—1979), choral conductor
 Ada Rogovtseva (b. 1937), theater and film actress
 Mykola Kondratyuk (1931—2006), opera and pop singer (baritone)
 Oleg Borisov (1929—1994), theater and film actor
 Hovhannes Chekijyan (b. 1928), choral conductor
 Mikhail Mansurov (1916—1993), stage actor

1979 
 Pavel Kadochnikov (1915—1988), theater and film actor and director
 Jurabek Murodov (b. 1942), pop singer (tenor), rubab performer
 Margarita Voites (b. 1936), opera singer (coloratura soprano)
 Dmitriy Zhuravlev (1900—1991), entertainer and performer
 Konstantin Orbelyan (1928—2014), composer and conductor
 Platon Maiboroda (1918—1989), composer
 Aleksandr Medvedkin (1900—1989), film director and screenwriter
 Dmitry Mikhailovich Tsyganov (1903—1992), violinist
 Ramazan Bapov (1947—2014), ballet dancer
 Sergei Plotnikov (1909—1990), theater and film actor
 Tsisana Tatishvili (1937—2017), opera singer (soprano)
 Aleksandra Prokoshina (1918—2005), singer (soprano)
 Edvardas Kaniava (b. 1937), opera singer (baritone)
 Vladimir Volzhansky (1917—1983), circus performer (acrobat, equilibrist)
 Yoldosh Azamov (1909—1985), film director
 Kalyj Moldobasanov (1929—2006), composer and conductor
 Gunārs Cilinskis (1931—1992), theater actor and director, film actor, film director
 Ādolfs Skulte (1909—2000), composer 
 Giga Lortkipanidze (1927—2013), theater and film director
 Dmytro Smolych (1919—1987), theater director
 Lev Venediktov (1924—2017), choral conductor
 Yaroslav Antonovich Voshchak (1921—1989), conductor
 Zurab Sotkilava (1937—2017), opera singer (tenor)
 Volodymyr Hrypych (1923—2005), theater director
 Otar Megvinetukhutsesi (1932—2013), theater and film actor

1980 

 Eduardas Balsys (1919—1984), composer
 Hendrik Krumm (1934—1989), opera singer (lyric-dramatic tenor)
 Tatyana Alekseevna Tayakina (р. 1951), ballet dancer
 Hakim Zaripov (1924–2023), circus performer (rider), film actor
 Nikolay Olkhovikov (1922—1987), circus performer (rider and juggler)
 Vladimir Oskal-Ool (1920—1999), circus performer (juggler and equilibrist)
 Vasiliy Tretyak (1926—1989), opera singer (tenor)
 Halyna Tuftina (1933—2007), opera singer (mezzo-soprano)
 Georgiy Zhzhonov (1915—2005), theater and film actor
 Ivan Dmitriev (1915—2003), theater and film actor
 Mukhamed Cherkezov (1911—1993), theater and film actor
 Asanali Ashimov (b. 1937), theater and film actor
 Farida Sharipova (1936—2010), actress
 Lidiya Mosolova (1918—1996), stage actress
 Pyotr Monastyrsky (1915—2013), theater director
 Galina Makarova (1919—1993), stage actress
 Ğabdulla Şamukof (1909—1981), actor
 Vera Kuzmina (b. 1923—2021), stage actress
 Nina Meshko (1917—2008), choral conductor
 Zeynab Khanlarova (b. 1936), opera singer (soprano), mugham performer
 Vyacheslav Hrinchenko (1938—1998), opera singer (bass)
 Saulius Sondeckis (1928—2016), conductor
 Vsevolod Yakut (1912—1991), theater and film actor
 Tengiz Abuladze (1924—1994), film director
 Ivan Solovyov (1910—1982), theater and film actor
 Rezo Chkheidze (1926—2015), film director
 Glaphira Sidorova (1922—2019), stage actress
 Andrey Petrov (1930—2006), composer
 Khoren Abrahamyan (1930—2004), theater and film actor, theater director
 Kayyrgül Sartbaeva (b. 1936), opera singer (lyric soprano)
 Vladimir Fedoseyev (b. 1932), conductor
 Olga Vysotskaya (1906—2000), All-Union Radio announcer
 Yuri Levitan (1914—1983), All-Union Radio announcer

1981 
 Metaksia Simonyan (1926—1987), stage actress
 Zoya Spirina (1926—1986), actress
 Shuhrat Abbosov (1931—2018), film director and screenwriter
 Nina Isakova (b. 1928), opera singer (mezzo-soprano)
 Alisa Freindlich (b. 1934), theater and film actress
 Yuri Simonov (р. 1941), conductor
 Gaziza Zhubanova (1927—1993), composer
 Erkeghali Rakhmadiev (1932—2013), composer
 Kim Bazarsadaev (1937—2002), opera singer (bass)
 Edvard Mirzoyan (1921—2012), composer
 Grigory Chukhray (1921—2001), film director, screenwriter
 Vladimir Morozov (1933—2002), opera singer (bass)
 Yuri Temirkanov (b. 1938), conductor
 Rihards Glāzups (1920—1993), conductor
 Nikolai Slichenko (1934—2021), actor and director
 Suimenkul Chokmorov (1939—1992), theater and film actor
 Maria Mordasova (1915—1997), singer, folk music performer 
 Leo Golovanov (1926—2015), dancer
 Rodion Shchedrin (р. 1932), composer
 Andrei Eshpai (1925—2015), composer
 Yuri Mazhuga (1931—2022), theater and film actor
 Vladimir Curbet (1930—2017), choreographer
 Yuliya Solntseva (1901—1989), film actress, film director
 Murad Kajlayev (b. 1931), composer, conductor
 Aysulu Tokombayeva (р. 1947), ballet dancer
 Boris Tenin (1905—1990), theater and film actor
 Sabira Ataeva (1917—1993), theater and film actress
 Anu Kaal (b. 1940), opera singer (lyric-coloratura soprano)
 Valentina Yermakova (1924—2003), theater and film actress, theater teacher
 Sergey Tikhonov (1921—1992), actor
 Mikheil Tumanishvili (1921—1996), theater director
 Tatiana Doronina (b. 1933), theater actress and director, film actress
 Ramaz Chkhikvadze (1928—2011), theater and film actor
 Pyotr Glebov (1915—2000), theater and film actor
 Lyudmila Chursina (b. 1941), theater and film actress

1982 

 Viktor Tarasov (1934—2006), actor
 Sharah Abzagovich Pachalia (1914—2000), theater director, actor, playwright
 Mikhail Chubinidze (1910—2006), theater and film actor
 Sholpan Zhandarbekova (1922—2005), stage actress
 Aleksandrs Lembergs (1921—1985), choreographer
 Idris Nogajbayev (1931—1989), stage actor
 Nikolay Levitsky (1911—1982), popular science film director
 Arutyun Akopyan (1918—2005), stage artist, illusionist
 Valentina Leontyeva (1923—2007), TV presenter, television announcer
 Tamara Sinyavskaya (b. 1943), singer (mezzo-soprano)
 Cholponbek Bazarbaev (1949—2002), ballet dancer
 Ivan Lapikov (1922—1993), theater and film actor
 Zagir Ismagilov (1917—2003), composer
 Henrik Malyan (1925—1988), film director, screenwriter
 Yevgeny Raikov (1937—2010), opera singer (lyric-dramatic tenor)
 Vladimir Kenigson (1907—1986), theater and film actor
 Nina Mamayeva (1923—2001), stage actress
 Irakly Andronikov (1908—1990), writer, spoken word artist
 Vladimir Andrianov (1906—1985), stage actor
 Robert Sturua (b. 1938), theater director
 Rem Lebedev (1928—1988), theater and film artist

1983 

 Aleksandr Alov (1923—1983), film director, screenwriter
 Vladimir Naumov (р. 1927), film director
 Ruben Agamirzian (1922—1991), theater director
 Anatoly Avdievsky (1933—2016), choral conductor
 Yevgeny Yevstigneyev (1926—1992), theater and film actor
 Tatiana Nikolayeva (1924—1993), pianist, composer
 Arvīds Žilinskis (1905—1993), composer
 Frunze Dovlatyan (1927—1997), film director, film actor
 Vladislav Piavko (1941—2020), opera singer (tenor)
 Nikita Bogoslovsky (1913—2004), composer
 Anatoly Kotcherga (b. 1947), opera singer (bass)
 Baudordzhi Yampilov (1916—1989), composer
 Gabriela Komleva (р. 1938), ballet dancer and choreographer
 Askold Makarov (1925—2000), ballet dancer and choreographer
 Olga Moiseyeva (1928—2021), ballet dancer and choreographer
 Nikolai Ohotnikov (1937—2017), singer (bass)
 Vladilen Semionov (b. 1932), ballet dancer and choreographer
 Alla Sizova (1939—2014), ballet dancer
 Ludmila Filatova (b. 1935), opera singer (mezzo-soprano)
 Oleg Vinogradov (b. 1937), choreographer
 Lyudmila Gurchenko (1935—2011), theater and film actress, pop singer
 Vladimir Basov (1923—1987), film director, actor
 Nani Bregvadze (b. 1938), pop singer
 Mikhail Gluzsky (1918—2001), theater and film actor
 Valery Egudin (1937—2007), opera singer (tenor)

1984 

 Malika Kalontarova (b. 1950), ballet dancer
 Frunzik Mkrtchyan (1930—1993), theater and film actor
 Evgeniy Glebov (1929—2000), composer
 Nurgisa Tlendiyev (1925—1998), conductor, composer
 Mihai Volontir (1934—2015), theater and film artist
 Viktor Korshunov (1929—2015), theater and film actor
 Aleksandra Pakhmutova (b. 1929), composer
 Serafim Tulikov (1914—2004), composer
 Eldar Ryazanov (1927—2015), film director
 Vladimir Etush (1922—2019), theater and film actor, theater teacher
 Marsil Sälimcanof (1934—2002), theater director
 Vladimir Samoilov (1924—1999), theater and film actor
 Kunduz Mirkarimova (1925—2019), ballet director-choreographer
 Alexander Kholminov (1925—2015), composer
 Tatyana Lioznova (1924—2011), film director
 Ioakim Sharoev (1930—2000), theater director and teacher
 Aleksey Chyrgal-ool (1924—1989), composer
 Nikolay Salamov (1922—2003), actor
 Svetlana Adyrkhaeva (b. 1938), ballet dancer
 Oleg Basilashvili (b. 1934), theater and film actor
 Vyacheslav Gordeyev (b. 1948), ballet dancer, choreographer
 Dmitri Kitayenko (b. 1940), conductor
 Nadezhda Pavlova (b. 1956), ballet dancer
 Khuseyn Mukhtarov (1938—2001), opera singer (bass)
 Toktonali Seytaliev (1937—2021), opera singer (lyric tenor)

1985 

 Shamgon Sagaddinovich Kazhigaliyev (1927—2015), conductor
 Nikolai Mikheyev (1923—1993), stage actor
 Raimonds Pauls (b. 1936), composer
 Leonid Markov (1927—1991), theater and film actor
 Armen Dzhigarkhanyan (1935—2020), theater and film actor
 Yuri Bogatikov (1932—2002), pop singer (baritone)
 Baba Annanov (1934—1991), theater director, actor
 Mikhail Bushnov (1923—2014), theater actor
 Valentin Elizariev (b. 1947), choreographer
 Arkadij Sawczenko (1936—2004), opera singer (baritone)
 Konstantin Adashevsky (1897—1987), theater and film actor
 Aleksandr Ivanovich Shchegolev (1913—1988), stage actor
 Sos Sargsyan (1929—2013), theater and film actor
 Regimantas Adomaitis (1937—2022), theater and film actor
 Maria Stefiuk (b. 1948), opera singer (lyric-coloratura soprano)
 Valentin Levashov (1915—1994), composer, choir conductor
 Yuri Ivanovich Kazakov (1924—2019), accordionist
 Inna Makarova (1926—2020), film actress
 Jansug Kakhidze (1936—2002), conductor
 Tolomush Okeyev (1935—2001), film director
 Ivan Ivanov-Vano (1900—1987), animation director
 Davletbay Khodzhabayev (1931—2019), circus performer, horse rider
 Boris Tchaikovsky (1925—1996), composer
 Vladimir Andreyev (1930—2020), theater and film actor
 Klara Luchko (1925—2005), theater and film actress
 Igor Shapovalov (b. 1945), ballet dancer, choreographer
 Mark Fradkin (1914—1990), composer
 Vasily Lanovoy (1934—2021), theater and film actor

1986 

 Imants Kokars (1921—2011), choral conductor
 Dugarzhap Dashiev (1939—2003), opera singer (lyric-dramatic tenor)
 Marlen Khutsiev (1925—2019), film director
 Georgy Pantyukov (1922—1994), choral conductor
 Vera Vasilyeva (р. 1925), theater and film actress
 Georgy Ansimov (1922—2015), director of operas and operettas
 Vyacheslav Nevinny (1934—2009), theater and film actor
 Eri Klas (1939—2016), conductor
 Edgar Hovhannisyan (1930—1998), composer
 Viktor Turov (1936—1996), film director
 Mihai Muntean (b. 1943), opera singer (lyric-dramatic tenor)
 Röstäm Yaxin (1921—1993), composer, pianist
 Alibek Dnishev (b. 1951), opera singer (lyric tenor)
 Margarita Drozdova (b. 1948), ballet dancer
 Ludmila Semenyaka (b. 1952), ballet dancer and teacher
 Vaclovas Daunoras (1937—2020), opera singer (bass)
 Makvala Kasrashvili (b. 1942), singer (lyric-dramatic soprano)
 Juozas Domarkas (b. 1936), conductor
 Arif Məlikov (1933—2019), composer
 Nikolai Kutuzov (1926—2011), composer, conductor
 Lyudmila Sakharova (1926—2012), ballet dancer, teacher
 Zebo Aminzoda (b. 1948), choreographer
 Vera Baeva (b. 1936), singer (lyric-coloratura soprano)

1987 

 Anna Pokidchenko (1926—2014), actress
 Quddus Khojamyarov (1918—1994), composer
 Eugen Doga (b. 1937), composer
 Veljo Tormis (1930—2017), composer
 Veronica Garștea (1927—2012), choral conductor
 Fyodor Khitruk (1917—2012), film director-animator
 Leonid Bronevoy (1928—2017), theater and film actor
 Igor Luchenok (1938—2018), composer
 Maya-Gozel Aimedova (b. 1941), theater and film actress
 Yuri Vladimirov (b. 1942), ballet dancer and teacher
 Nina Sorokina (1942—2011), ballet dancer
 Yevgeniya Khanayeva (1921—1987), theater and film actress
 Viktor Tretiakov (b. 1946), violinist
 Joseph Kobzon (1937—2018), pop singer (baritone)
 Leonid Smetannikov (b. 1943), opera singer (baritone), teacher

1988 

 Oleg Tabakov (1935—2018), theater and film actor, director, theater teacher
 Yury Solomin (b. 1935), theater and film actor and director
 Valentina Kovel (1923—1997), theater and film actress
 Sulkhan Tsintsadze (1925—1991), composer
 Volodymyr Shevchenko (1946—2012), circus performer
 Lyudmyla Shevchenko (b. 1945), circus performer
 Igor Talankin (1927—2010), film director
 Nikolai Nekrasov (1932—2012), folk music conductor
 Giya Kancheli (1935—2019), composer
 Harijs Liepins (1927—1998), theater artist
 Stefaniya Stanyuta (1905—2000), theater and film actress
 Estebes Tursunaliev (1931—2005), akyn-improviser
 Arnold Katz (1924—2007), conductor
 Sofia Rotaru (b. 1947), pop singer
 Khashim Gadoyev (b. 1937), stage actor
 Anatoliy Molodov (1929—2017), choral conductor
 Fidan Gasimova (b. 1948), opera singer (soprano)
 Varduhi Varderesyan (1928—2015), theater and film actress
 Anegina Ilina-Dmitrieva (b. 1943), opera singer (mezzo-soprano)
 Igor Kirillov (1932—2021), TV presenter
 Eldar Shengelaia (b. 1933), film director
 Mikhail Pugovkin (1923—2008), theater and film actor
 Oleg Strizhenov (b. 1929), theater and film actor
 Serhii Danchenko (1937—2001), theater director
 Vladimir Minin (р. 1929), choral conductor
 Edita Piekha (b. 1937), pop singer
 Lev Raskatov (1927—1993), stage actor
 Uldis Žagata (1928—2015), ballet dancer, choreographer
 Liana Isakadze (b. 1946), violinist, conductor
 Sergey Kolosov (1921—2012), film director, screenwriter
 Nikita Dolgushin (1938—2012), ballet dancer, choreographer
 Gizela Tsypola (b. 1944), opera singer (soprano)
 Lyudmila Yermakova (1927—2008), choral conductor

1989 

 Yevgeny Malinin (1930—2001), pianist
 Nikolai Rakov (1908—1990), composer
 Nikolai Yeremenko Sr. (1926—2000), film actor
 Eliso Virsaladze (b 1942), pianist
 Vladimir Doveyko (1922—2002), circus performer, acrobat
 Natalya Durova (1934—2007), circus performer (tamer)
 Yuri Yermolayev (1932—2017), circus performer (horse trainer, rider)
 Irbek Kantemirov (1928—2000), circus performer (horse rider)
 Valery Klimov (b. 1931), violinist
 Pavel Necheporenko (1916—2009), musician (balalaika player), teacher
 Igor Oistrakh (1931—2021), violinist
 Nicolae Sulac (1936—2003), singer
 Samarbubu Toktakunova (b. 1944), musician-instrumentalist
 Yan Frenkel (1920—1989), composer
 Boris Akimov (b. 1946), ballet dancer
 Leonid Gaidai (1923—1993), film director
 Yevgeny Vesnik (1923—2009), theater and film actor
 Galina Volchek (1933—2019), theater director and actress
 Georgiy Daneliya (1930—2019), film director and screenwriter
 Zita Dreiere (Errs) (b. 1952), ballet dancer
 Mira Koltsova (1938—2022), dancer, choreographer
 Leonid Yasinovskiy (1923—2003), stage actor
 Leonid Gubanov (1928—2004), actor of the Moscow Art Theater
 Victor Popov (1934—2008), choral conductor
 Ilya Frez (1909—1994), film director

1990 

 Ville Golovko (1932—2015) — artistic director (chief director) of the variety and circus studio "Sintez"
 Mikk Mikiver (1937—2006) — stage actor, director, film actor
 Lev Durov (1931—2015), theatre director
 Vladimir Spivakov (b. 1944), violinist and conductor
 Sydyk Mukhamedzhanov (1924—1991), composer
 Mstislav Zapashny (1938—2016), circus artist, animal trainer, director
 Iya Savvina (1936—2011) — stage actress
 Mikhail Schweitzer (1920—2000) — film director
 Vladimir Krainev (1944—2011) — pianist
 Nina Dorliak (1908—1998) — chamber singer (soprano)
 Oleksandr Bilash (1931—2003), composer
 Rolan Bykov (1929—1998) — theater and film actor, film director
 Zinovy Gerdt (1916—1996), theater and film actor
 Gyulli Mubaryakova (1936—2019) — theatre artist
 Leonid Boldin (1931—2013), opera singer
 Aleksandr Dmitriyev (b. 1935) — conductor
 Tatyana Karpova (1916—2018), stage actress
 Ivan Bobylyov (1925—2014), actor, theater director, teacher
 Grigory Ponomarenko (1921—1996) — composer
 Viktar Roŭda (1921—2007), choral conductor, teacher
 Lidiya Sukharevskaya (1909—1991), stage actress
 Georgiy Vitsin (1917—2001), theater and film actor
 Lyubov Sokolova (1921—2001), film actress
 Farhad Badalbeyli (b. 1947), pianist and teacher
 Vladislav Mikosha (1909—2004), cinematographer and film director
 Victor Merzhanov (1919—2012) — pianist and teacher
 Galina Shoydagbaeva (b. 1953), opera singer
 Nikolay Trofimov (1920—2005), stage actor
 Zara Dolukhanova (1918—2007), opera singer (coloratura mezzo-soprano), teacher

1991 

 Nikolai Arnoldovich Petrov (1943—2011), pianist
 Vladimir Mulyavin (1941—2003), pop singer (dramatic tenor), guitarist, composer, leader of the band Pesniary
 Stepan Oleksenko (1941—2006), stage actor
 Bohdan Stupka (1941—2012), theatre and film actor
 Maria Mironova (1911—1997), theater and film actress
 Lyudmila Shaposhnikova (1921—2003), theater and film actress
 Yuri Bashmet (b. 1953), violist and conductor
 Mark Zakharov (1933—2019), theater and film director
 Larisa Shevchenko (b. 1950), opera singer (soprano)
 Samson Samsonov (1921—2002), film director
 Mykola Kolessa (1903—2006), composer and conductor
 Eduard Kolmanovsky (1923—1994), composer 
 Inna Churikova (b. 1943), theater and film actress
 Mikhail Zimin (1930—1991), theatre and film actor
 Natalia Gutman (b. 1942), cellist
 Ghazaros Saryan (1920—1998), composer
 Bolotbek Shamshiyev (1941—2019), film director
 Yoqub Ahmedov (b. 1938), theater and film artist
 Eduard Grach (b. 1930), violinist
 Ajdar Ibrahimov (1919—1993), film director
 Vladislav Chernushenko (b. 1936), choir conductor and teacher
 Lev Vlassenko (1928—1996), pianist
 Ashir Kuliev (1918—2000), composer
 Kapar Medetbekov (1931—2012), theater and film artist
 Gennady Ovsyannikov (b. 1935), actor
 Anatoly Poletaev (b. 1936), accordionist, conductor
 Alla Pugacheva (b. 1949), pop singer
 Avet Terterian (1929—1994), composer
 Natalia Shakhovskaya (1935—2017), cellist
 Valeriy Yakovlev (b. 1939), theater director
 Sofiya Pilyavskaya (1911—2000), theater and film actress
 Oleg Yankovsky (1944—2009), theater and film actor

Visual arts (Narodny khudozhnik)

1943 

 Aleksandr Gerasimov (1881—1963), painter
 Boris Ioganson (1893—1973), artist and pedagogue
 Sergey Merkurov (1881—1952), sculptor
 Vera Mukhina (1889—1953), sculptor

1944 
 Vasyl Kasiian (1896—1976), graphic artist
 Anatol Petrytsky (1895—1964), painter
 Oleksii Shovkunenko (1884—1974), painter

1950 

 Konstantin Yuon (1875—1958), painter, art theorist

1951 
 Fyodor Fedorovsky (1883—1955), stage designer

1953 
 Moisey Toidze (1871—1953), painter

1956 
 Vasily Baksheyev (1862—1958), painter 
 Igor Grabar (1871—1960), artist, art critic, educator, restorer

1957 
 Teodors Zaļkalns (1876—1972), sculptor
 Antanas Žmuidzinavičius (1876—1966), painter
 Vsevolod Vsevolodovich Lishev (1877—1960), sculptor

1958 
 Sergey Konenkov (1874—1971), sculptor 
 Sergey Vasilyevich Gerasimov (1885—1964), painter 
 Porfiry Nikitich Krylov (1902—1990), painter and graphic artist
 Mikhail Kupriyanov (1903—1991), painter and graphic artist 
 Nikolai Sokolov (1903—2000), graphic artist and painter
 Vladimir Aleksandrovich Serov (1910—1968), painter and graphic artist, teacher
 Matvey Manizer (1891—1966), sculptor

1959 
 Yevgeny Vuchetich (1908—1974), sculptor

1960 
 Martiros Saryan (1880—1972), landscape painter, graphic artist and stage designer
 Nikolai Tomsky (1900—1984), sculptor

1961 
 Juozas Mikėnas (1901—1964), sculptor

1962 

 Vadim Fedorovič Ryndin (1902—1974), stage designer
 Arkady Plastov (1893—1972), painter
 Pavel Korin (1892—1967), painter

1963 
 Mikayil Abdullayev (1921—2002), painter and graphic artist
 Mikhail Anikushin (1917—1997), sculptor
 Yekaterina Fyodorovna Belashova (1906—1971), sculptor
 Ilya Bogdesko (1923—2010), graphic artist
 Mykhailo Bozhy (1911—1990), painter
 Yosyp Bokshay (1891—1975), painter
 Aleksandr Deyneka (1899—1969), painter, graphic artist and sculptor
 Mykhailo Derehus (1904—1997), graphic artist and painter
 Ucha Japaridze (1906—1988), painter, graphic artist 
 Nikolay Nikolayevich Zhukov (1908—1973), painter, graphic artist, poster artist
 Alexander Kibalnikov (1912—1987), sculptor
 Mykhailo Lysenko (1906—1972), sculptor 
 Evald Okas (1915—2011), painter and teacher
 Ara Sargsyan (1902—1969), sculptor
 Leo Svemps (1897—1975), painter, teacher
 Ural Tansykbayev (1904—1974), painter
 Vladimir Favorsky (1886—1964), graphic artist, woodcut illustrator, painter, art critic, muralist
 Semyon Afanasyevich Chuikov (1902—1980), painter
 Vytautas Jurkūnas (1910—1993), graphic artist

1965 
 Boris Volkov (1900—1970), stage designer
 Vasily Yefanov (1900—1978), painter
 Jonas Kuzminskis (1906—1985), graphic artist
 Yuri Neprintsev (1909—1996), painter, graphic artist
 Yakov Romas (1902—1969), painter and teacher
 Fedir Nirod (1907—1996), stage designer

1967 
 Dementy Shmarinov (1907—1999), graphic artist and draftsman
 Boris Yefimov (1900—2008), graphic artist, master of political caricature
 Anatoliy Arefyev (1918—1989), stage designer
 Yevgeny Kibrik (1906—1978), painter and graphic artist, illustrator, teacher

1969 
 Veniamin Pinchuk (1908—1987), sculptor
 Dmitry Nalbandyan (1906—1993), painter
 Günther Reindorff (1889—1974), graphic artist, book illustrator
 Yevgeni Yenej (1890—1971), production designer
 Victor Oreshnikov (1904—1987), painter and teacher

1970 

 Yuri Ivanovich Pimenov (1903—1977), painter, graphic artist
 Apollon Kutateladze (1900—1972), painter
 Yevsey Moiseyenko (1916—1988), painter, graphic artist and teacher

1971 
 Gapar Aytiyev (1912—1984), painter, stage designer
 Alexei Pakhomov (1900—1973), graphic artist and painter
 Boris Prorokov (1911—1972), satirist, political propaganda artist
 Nikolai Romadin (1903—1987), painter

1972 
 Aleksandra Briede (1901—1992), sculptor
 Lado Gudiashvili (1886—1980), artist

1973 
 Aminadav Kanevsky (1898—1976), graphic artist
 Tahir Salahov (1928—2021), painter
 Izzat Klychev (1923—2006), painter
 Zair Azgur (1908—1995), sculptor
 Pinkhos Sabsay (1893—1980), sculptor

1974 
 Serhii Hryhoriev (1910—1988), painter and graphic artist (Указ от 18.04.1974)
 Aleksei Gritsai (1914—1998), painter
 Serhiy Shyshko (1911—1997), painter
 Pjotr Tarasovitsj Maltsev (1907—1993), painter
 Fyodor Pavlovich Reshetnikov (1906—1988), painter
 Ivan Maksimovich Semenov (1906—1982), graphic artist
 Nikolay Zinovyev (1888—1979), palekh miniature artist

1975 
 Eduards Kalnin̦š (1904—1988), painter

1976 
 Yervand Kochar (1899—1979), sculptor
 Simon Virsaladze (1909—1989), costume designer
 Andrei Mylnikov (1919—2012), painter
 Mykola Hlushchenko (1901—1977), painter
 Taras Gaponenko (1906—1993), painter

1977 
 Edgars Iltners (1925—1983), painter
 Yury Kugach (1917—2013), painter
 Vasyl Borodai (1917—2010), sculptor
 Nikolay Afanasevitsj Ponomarjov (1918—1997), graphic artist
 Lev Kerbel (1917—2003), sculptor
 Joseph Serebriany (1907—1979), painter

1978 
 Vladimir Tsigal (1917—2013), sculptor
 Moechamedchanafija Timirbolatovitsj Telzjanov (1927—2013), painter
 Mikhail Baburin (1907—1984), sculptor
 Mikhail Savicki (1922—2010), painter
 Pavel Bondarenko (1917—1992), sculptor
 Vladimir Shtranikh (1888—1981), painter

1979 

 Viktor Puzyrkov (1918—1999), painter
 Geliy Korzhev (1925—2012), painter
 Oleksandr Kovalov (1915—1991), sculptor

1980 
 Zinovy Vilensky (1899—1984), sculptor
 Zurab Tsereteli (b. 1934), painter and sculptor
 Haris Yakupov (1919—2010), painter
 Ilya Glazunov (1930—2017), artist
 Sulo Juntunen (1915—1980), painter
 Lindia Brodskaia (1910—1991), painter
 Dmitry Mochalsky (1908—1988), painter

1981 
 Vitaly Goryayev (1910—1982), graphic illustrator, painter, cartoonist
 Ephraim Ivanovich Zverkov (1921—2012), painter
 Rahim Axmedov (1924—2008), painter

1982 
 Boris Ugarov (1922—1991), painter
 Tetyana Yablonska (1917—2005), painter
 Iosif Sumbatashvili (1915—2012), stage designer
 Nikolay Nikoghosyan (1918—2018), sculptor, painter and graphic artist
 Boris Domashnikov (1924—2003), painter

1983 
 Alexey Tkachyov (b. 1925), painter
 Sergey Tkachyov (1922—2022), painter
 Orest Vereisky (1915—1993), book illustrator
 Grigor Khanjyan (1926—2000), painter and graphic artist

1985 
 Antanas Gudaitis (1904—1989), painer
 Mykola Oviechkin (1929—1993), painer
 Anna Alexandrovna Kotukhina (1915—2007), palekh miniature artist
 Kazys Morkūnas (1924—2014), stained glass artist
 Alexandr Shilov (b. 1943), painter and graphic artist, author of portraits
 Mikhail Bogdanov (1914—1995), production designer
 Vecheslav Zagonek (1919—1994), painer
 Yuri Korolyov (1929—1992), painer

1986 
 Turgunbaĭ Sadykov (b. 1935), sculptor
 Yevgeny Shirokov (1931—2017), painter
 Boris Valentinovich Shcherbakov (1916—1995), painter
 Indulis Zariņš (1929—1997), painter

1987 
 Gediminas Jokūbonis (1927—2006), sculptor
 Andrey Ilyich Kurnakov (1916—2010), painter, teacher
 Merab Berżenišvili (1929—2016), sculptor
 Oleg Komov (1932—1994), sculptor, graphic artist

1988 
 Valentin Mikhailovich Sidorov (1928—2021), painter
 Mikhail Mikhailovich Taraev (1920—1996), ceramic artist
 Afanasiy Osipov (1928—2017), painter
 Elguja Amashukeli (1928—2002), sculptor
 Yulian Rukavishnikov (1922—2000), sculptor

1989 

 Akhmat Lutfullin (1928—2007), painter
 Togrul Narimanbekov (1930—2013), painter, stage designer
 Valery Levental (1938—2015), stage designer
 Pyotr Pavlovich Ossovsky (1925—2015), painter, graphic artist

1990 
 Leonid Soifertis (1911—1996), graphic artist
 Mariam Aslamazyan (1907—2006), painter
 Sukhrob Kurbanov (1946—2016), painter and graphic artist
 Viktor Ivanov (b. 1924), painter

1991 
 Fedor Danilovich Konstantinov (1910—1997), graphic artist
 Andrey Vasnetsov (1924—2009), painter
 Vladimir Zamkov (1925—1998), painter
 Lyudmila Azarova (1919—2010), ceramic artist
 Vladimir Aleksandrovich Igoshev (1921—2007), painter and graphic artist
 Petr Timofeevich Fomin (1919—1996), painter and teacher

References

Literature 
 Народные артисты СССР. В 2-х т. / Авт.-сост. М. В. Музалевский и В. Л. Иванов. — Moscow: РИЦ «Кавалер», 2007.
 

People's Artists of the USSR
Lists of artists